Amphogona is a genus of deep-sea hydrozoans of the family of Rhopalonematidae. It has a cosmopolitan distribution in tropical to temperate oceans.

Species
There are three species:
 Amphogona apicata Kramp, 1957
 Amphogona apsteini (Vanhöffen, 1902)
 Amphogona pusilla Hartlaub, 1909

References

Rhopalonematidae
Hydrozoan genera